Actinoptera is a genus of tephritid or fruit flies in the family Tephritidae.

Species
Actinoptera abdita Munro, 1957
Actinoptera acculta Munro, 1957
Actinoptera ampla Munro, 1957
Actinoptera biseta Hering, 1956
Actinoptera brahma (Schiner, 1868)
Actinoptera carignaniensis Kapoor & Grewal, 1977
Actinoptera conexa Ito, 2011
Actinoptera contacta Munro, 1957
Actinoptera discoidea (Fallén, 1814)
Actinoptera espunensis Hering, 1934
Actinoptera filaginis (Loew, 1862)
Actinoptera formosana Shiraki, 1933
Actinoptera fuscula Munro, 1957
Actinoptera kovacsi (Bezzi, 1924)
Actinoptera lindneri Hering, 1954
Actinoptera mamulae (Frauenfeld, 1855)
Actinoptera meigeni Hendel, 1927
Actinoptera montana (Meijere, 1924)
Actinoptera mundella (Bezzi, 1924)
Actinoptera pallidula Munro, 1957
Actinoptera peregrina (Adams, 1905)
Actinoptera reticulata Ito, 1984
Actinoptera rosetta Munro, 1934
Actinoptera schnabeli (Speiser, 1924)
Actinoptera shirakiana Munro, 1935
Actinoptera sinica Wang, 1990
Actinoptera stricta Munro, 1957
Actinoptera tatarica Hendel, 1927
Actinoptera tientsinensis Chen, 1938
Actinoptera tuckeri (Bezzi, 1924)
Actinoptera vinsoni Munro, 1946

References

Tephritinae
Tephritidae genera